Community Memorial Hospital of San Buenaventura is a 242-bed community-based teaching hospital located in Ventura, California.  The hospital is accredited by the Joint Commission.  In the most recent year with available data, 38,013 patients visited the emergency department, 13,314 patients were admitted to the hospital, and physicians performed 4,133 inpatient and 7,151 outpatient surgeries.

Community Memorial Hospital started as a single hospital in 1901. Today it has grown into an expansive healthcare system with two hospitals and eleven family practice centers serving various communities in the Ventura County area.

Community Memorial Hospital has begun building a new six-story,  hospital next to the current location.  The new building was scheduled to open in 2015, but is now expected to open in December 2018, and will have 250 private rooms.

Medical education
Community Memorial Hospital operates a number of residency programs that train newly graduated physicians.  Programs include family medicine, internal medicine, and orthopedic surgery, general surgery  and psychiatry residencies.

References

External links 
 Community Memorial Hospital of San Buenaventura
 This hospital in the CA Healthcare Atlas A project by OSHPD

Hospital buildings completed in 1901
Hospitals in Ventura County, California
Hospitals established in 1901
Buildings and structures in Ventura, California